Maryam Safarova (born July 3, 2003) is an Azerbaijani group rhythmic gymnast. She is the 2020 European Group All-around silver medalist.

Career

Senior
She made her World Championships debut in 2019 in Baku where she contributed Ribbon performance to 13th place in Team competition.

In 2020, she competed at the 2020 European Championships, her third one. Together with Zeynab Hummatova, Darya Sorokina, Yelyzaveta Luzan and Laman Alimuradova she won silver medal in Group All-around and bronze medal in 3 Hoops + 4 Clubs final. They also won bronze medal in Team competition together with juniors.

References

External links 
 

Living people
2003 births
Azerbaijani rhythmic gymnasts
Sportspeople from Baku
Medalists at the Rhythmic Gymnastics European Championships